Masyakovo (Mäsäk) is a rural locality (a village) in Abzaevsky Selsoviet, Kiginsky District, Bashkortostan, Russia. The population was 225 as of 2010. There is 1 street.

Geography 
Masyakovo is located 32 km north of Verkhniye Kigi (the district's administrative centre) by road. Abzayevo is the nearest rural locality.

References 

Rural localities in Kiginsky District